Waltheria is a genus of flowering plants in the mallow family, Malvaceae.  It is sometimes placed in Sterculiaceae. The name honours German botanist Augustin Friedrich Walther (1688–1746).

Selected species
Waltheria calcicola Urb. – Raichie
Waltheria indica L. – Basora-prieta, uhaloa
Waltheria virgata - Ewart & Cookson
Waltheria tomentosa

References

External links

Byttnerioideae
Malvaceae genera